The Skirmish at Albany, Missouri was a battle that was fought between the Union Army and the Quantrill's Raiders in Gentry County, Missouri on October 26, 1864. The battle resulted a Union victory, and the notorious Quantrill Raider member William T. Anderson, also known as "Bloody Bill", was killed at this battle.

See also
 William T. Anderson
 Samuel P. Cox

References

Albany
Albany
1864 in Missouri
Conflicts in 1864
October 1864 events
Ray County, Missouri